First-seeded Jimmy Connors was the defending champion of the singles event at the ABN World Tennis Tournament, but lost in the final against second-seeded Guillermo Vilas 0–6, 6–2, 6–4.

Seeds

Draw

Finals

Upper half

Lower half

References

External links
 ITF tournament edition details

1982 ABN World Tennis Tournament